PLUMED is an open-source library implementing enhanced-sampling algorithms, various free-energy methods, and analysis tools for molecular dynamics simulations. It is designed to be used together with ACEMD, AMBER, DL_POLY, GROMACS, LAMMPS, NAMD, OpenMM, ABIN, CP2K, i-PI, PINY-MD, and Quantum ESPRESSO, but it can also be used to together with analysis and visualization tools VMD, HTMD, and OpenPathSampling.

In addition, PLUMED can be used as a standalone tool for analysis of molecular dynamics trajectories. A graphical user interface named METAGUI is available.

Collective variables
PLUMED offers a large collection of collective variables that serve as descriptions of complex processes that occur during molecular dynamics simulations, for example angles, positions, distances, interaction energies, and total energy.

References

External links
 
 METAGUI

Molecular dynamics software
Computational biology
Free software programmed in C++
Free and open-source software